Marktleuthen is a municipality in the district of Wunsiedel, in Bavaria, Germany. It is situated on the river Eger, 10 km north of Wunsiedel and 11 km southwest of Selb.

Transportation 

The town has a train station and lies on the Regensburg-Hof railway.

References

Wunsiedel (district)